Derbyshire County Cricket Club in 1909 was the cricket season when the English club  Derbyshire had been playing for 38 years. It was their fifteenth season in the County Championship and  they won two matches to finish fifteenth in the Championship table.

1909 season

Derbyshire played twenty two matches in the County Championship and one against the touring Australians. They won two matches, both in the championship and drew four. Reginald Rickman was in his second season as captain. Samuel Cadman scored most runs and Arnold Warren  took most wickets. 

Joseph Bowden made his debut in the season and went on to become a regular until 1930.  John Chapman, who was captain before and after the war, also played his first season for the club. Other new players were Frederick Newton who appeared over six years and George Grainger who put in intermittent appearances over five years. Herbert Bowmer played the first of three matches in three years and Samuel Langton the first of three matches in two years. Stanley Dickinson and Lemuel Smith  made their only two appearances for the club, and Charles Nornable  his one career match during the season.

Matches

{| class="wikitable" width="100%"
! bgcolor="#efefef" colspan=6 | List of  matches
|- bgcolor="#efefef"
!No.
!Date
!V
!Result 
!Margin
!Notes
|- 
|1
| 3 May 1909 
| Yorkshire  County Ground, Derby 
|bgcolor="#FF0000"|Lost
|Innings and 127 runs
|  
|- 
|2
|10 May 1909 
|  Sussex    County Ground, Derby 
|bgcolor="#FFCC00"|Drawn
|
| Heygate 136; Vincett 5-25; A Warren 5-82  
|- 
|3
|15 May 1909 
| Warwickshire  County Ground, Derby 
|bgcolor="#FFCC00"|Drawn
|
| A Morton 6-41 
|- 
|4
|20 May 1909 
| Kent  Queen's Park, Chesterfield 
|bgcolor="#FF0000"|Lost
| Innings and 141 runs
|  
|- 
|5
| 27 May 1909 
|  Surrey Kennington Oval 
|bgcolor="#FF0000"|Lost
| 283 runs
| Rushby 5-28 and 5-28; Smith 5-23  
|- 
|6
| 31 May 1909 
| Essex   County Ground, Leyton 
|bgcolor="#FF0000"|Lost
| 4 wickets
| A Morton 6-38; Buckenham 6-40 
|- 
|7
| 7 Jun 1909 
| Leicestershire  County Ground, Derby 
|bgcolor="#FF0000"|Lost
| 165 runs
| Crawford 107; Jayes 6-62 and 5-77; A Warren 6-86  
|- 
|8
|12 Jun 1909 
| Warwickshire  Bulls Head Ground, Coventry  
|bgcolor="#00FF00"|Won
| 6 wickets
| J Chapman 198; Hargreave 5-81; A Warren 5-85 and 5-110 
|- 
|9
|21 Jun 1909 
| Hampshire   Miners Welfare Ground, Blackwell 
|bgcolor="#FFCC00"|Drawn
|
| LLewellyn 5-55; A Warren 5-50; Newman 5-52 
|- 
|10
|1 Jul 1909 
|  Surrey  Queen's Park, Chesterfield 
|bgcolor="#FF0000"|Lost
| Innings and 76 runs
| Davis 112; Smith 7-46; Rushby 6-31 
|- 
|11
| 8 Jul 1909 
|  Sussex     County Ground, Hove 
|bgcolor="#FF0000"|Lost
| Innings and 274 runs
| Leach 113; Killick 7-39; Cox 6-65 
|- 
|12
| 12 Jul 1909 
| Kent  Nevill Ground, Tunbridge Wells  
|bgcolor="#FF0000"|Lost
| Innings and 134 runs
| Blythe 8-49; A Morton 5-125 
|- 
|13
|15 Jul 1909 
| Hampshire  County Ground, Southampton 
|bgcolor="#FF0000"|Lost
| 168 runs
| RB Rickman 5-80 
|- 
|14
| 22 Jul 1909 
| Australians  County Ground, Derby 
|bgcolor="#FF0000"|Lost
| 10 wickets
| Trumper 113; O'Connor 7-40; A Morton 5-63 
|- 
|15
| 26 Jul 1909 
| Northamptonshire   County Ground, Northampton 
|bgcolor="#FF0000"|Lost
| Innings and 95 runs
| S Smith 7-87 and 7-36 
|- 
|16
|29 Jul 1909 
| Nottinghamshire   North Road Ground, Glossop  
|Abandoned
|
|  
|- 
|17
|2 Aug 1909 
| Essex   County Ground, Derby 
|bgcolor="#FF0000"|Lost
| 136 runs
| Buckenham 6-41 and 6-38  
|- 
|18
|5 Aug 1909 
| Leicestershire  Aylestone Road, Leicester 
|bgcolor="#00FF00"|Won
| 2 wickets
|SWA Cadman 112; A Warren 5-63 
|- 
|19
| 12 Aug 1909 
| Yorkshire  Bramall Lane, Sheffield 
|bgcolor="#FF0000"|Lost
| 5 wickets
| Denton 130; W Bestwick 6-88; 
|- 
|20
|16 Aug 1909 
| Lancashire  Queen's Park, Chesterfield 
|bgcolor="#FF0000"|Lost
| 150 runs
|  
|- 
|21
|19 Aug 1909 
| Northamptonshire   County Ground, Derby 
|bgcolor="#FF0000"|Lost
| 8 wickets
| Thompson 7-56 and 5-51; A Warren 5-107 
|- 
|22
| 23 Aug 1909 
| Lancashire   Old Trafford, Manchester 
|bgcolor="#FFCC00"|Drawn
|
| Dean 6-30 
|- 
|23
|26 Aug 1909 
| Nottinghamshire    Trent Bridge, Nottingham 
|bgcolor="#FF0000"|Lost
| Innings and 94 runs
| Gunn 101; A Warren 5-91; Wass 7-42; Hallam 7-29 
|- 
|

Statistics

County Championship batting averages

County Championship bowling averages

Wicket Keeper
Joe Humphries  Catches 29,  Stumping  9

See also
Derbyshire County Cricket Club seasons
1909 English cricket season

References

1909 in English cricket
Derbyshire County Cricket Club seasons
English cricket seasons in the 20th century